Lewis A. Martineé is a producer, songwriter and disc jockey based in Miami, Florida.  Martineé reached number one on the Billboard Pop Charts as writer and producer of the song "Seasons Change" by Latin freestyle group Exposé and has had multiple records reach top ten.  Martineé received Billboard Songwriter of the Year as well as BMI Songwriter of the Year.  In addition to founding Exposé in 1984, he also wrote and produced all of the songs on its first two albums, Exposure (1987) and What You Don't Know (1989). He also contributed to the group's third effort, Exposé, in 1992.

The producer explained how Exposé began in a 2016 interview on music website, No Echo:

Martineé has also worked with many other artists of note, producing, writing and or remixing tracks for artists including Ricky Martin, Dead or Alive, Enrique Iglesias, Celine Dion, Company B, Arika Kane, Jermaine Jackson, Sequal, the Cover Girls, Debbie Gibson, Vanessa Williams, Pet Shop Boys, Son by Four, and Elvis Crespo, among others. His contributions to the nascent freestyle music movement in the mid-1980s contributed to its popularity, which continues to this day. DJ Martineé has been doing a dance music radio show programmed all over the world with top ratings.

References

Living people
Year of birth missing (living people)